Subhas Chandra Bose Centenary College, established in 1998, is a general degree college in Lalbagh, Murshidabad district. It offers undergraduate courses in arts. It is affiliated to  University of Kalyani.

Departments

Arts

Bengali
History
Education
Urdu
Sanskrit
Geography
Philosophy 
Political Science

See also

References

External links
Subhas Chandra Bose Centenary College
University of Kalyani
University Grants Commission
National Assessment and Accreditation Council

Colleges affiliated to University of Kalyani
Universities and colleges in Murshidabad district
Memorials to Subhas Chandra Bose
Educational institutions in India with year of establishment missing